Maurice Horan (born 1976) is an Irish Gaelic football manager and former player. He is a former manager of the senior Limerick county team.

Horan experienced a relatively unsuccessful playing career at club level with Ballinrobe and Monaleen and at inter-county level with Mayo and Limerick. He was a full-forward for both club and county; however, his career ended without any provincial success in either Connacht or Munster.

Immediately after retiring from inter-county activity Horan became involved in team management. He served as manager of the Limerick under-21 football team for a period. Horan was appointed manager of the Limerick senior football team in October 2010. He resigned in July 2013.

Ahead of the 2020 season he joined the Laois backroom team as a coach.

References

 

1976 births
Living people
Ballinrobe Gaelic footballers
Gaelic football coaches
Gaelic football managers
Laois county football team
Limerick inter-county Gaelic footballers
Mayo inter-county Gaelic footballers
Monaleen Gaelic footballers